The Hyde and District Weavers', Winders', Warpers' and Doublers' Association was a trade union representing workers in the cotton industry around Hyde, then in Cheshire and Derbyshire in England.

There was a friendly society of weavers in the Hyde area in the 1870s but, by 1880, this appears to have become inactive.  The year, the Hyde, Hadfield and District Weavers' Association was established, its Hadfield branch being established in 1881.  In 1884, it was a founder member of the Amalgamated Weavers' Association.

The union grew quickly, with branches in other local towns and villages, and had 4,500 members by the 1890s.  Unlike unions in many other industries, the large majority of its members were women.  By 1906, long-term general secretary William Pope was in post, and that year he helped set up the nearby Stockport Weavers' Association.

By 1910, the union recognised its broader membership by adopting the name Hyde, Hadfield, Compstall, Broadbottom and Marple Weavers', Winders' and Warpers' Association.  At this time, it had 7,200 members.  In 1922, the small Glossop and District Power Loom Weavers union merged into it, but Glossop was not appended to its name.

Membership of the union declined along with the British cotton industry, and by 1968 it was down to only 550.  That year, it shortened its name to the "Hyde and District Weavers', Winders' and Doublers' Association".  In 1972, the union merged with the Ashton-under-Lyne and District Power-Loom Weavers' Association and the Stockport and District Weavers', Winders', Warpers' and Reelers' Association, forming the South East Lancashire and Cheshire Weavers' and Winders' Association.

General Secretaries
William Bancroft
1890s: J. Challenor
T. Lloyd
1900s: William Pope
1942: H. A. Taylor
1960s: L. H. Seel

References

Defunct trade unions of the United Kingdom
Hyde, Greater Manchester
Cotton industry trade unions
1880 establishments in the United Kingdom
1972 disestablishments in the United Kingdom
Trade unions established in 1880
Trade unions disestablished in 1972
Trade unions based in Greater Manchester